Tub Ring is a Chicago-based rock band.

Biography
Tub Ring was formed in 1992 by Jason Fields, Kevin Gibson, Chris "Mouse" Blake, and Geoff Valker as a high school experimental rock band. After the passing of their manager, Lee Swanson in 1994, the band lineup changed and took form with the addition of keyboardist Rob Kleiner. Kleiner spent his teenage years following around the band Mr. Bungle. With Kleiner added to the band, Tub Ring adopted a similar sound to that of Mr. Bungle. Mr. Bungle guitarist Trey Spruance took note of Kleiner's passion and creativity and ended up producing their first official full-length album, Drake Equation. In the late 1990s and early 2000s, Tub Ring associated with the bands Dog Fashion Disco and Mindless Self Indulgence. Aforementioned musical collaborations include when Rob Kleiner filled in for Mindless Self Indulgence's injured guitarist (Steve, Righ?) on the road in 2004 and 2005. On December 10, 2005, Tub Ring came in second place during MTV2's "Dew Circuit Breakout" competition. Tub Ring performed two songs throughout the competition including "Future Was Free" as well as a cover of Justin Timberlake's "Rock Your Body". On October 17, 2006, it was announced on experimental metal/rock record label The End Records's official website that the band had signed with them. The band released their album, The Great Filter in May 2007. On August 31, 2010, Tub ring released their fifth studio album, Secret Handshakes. On October 31, 2016 an announcement was made on the Tub Ring Facebook page that they would be releasing a best of album and a brand new EP in May 2017 backed by a Kickstarter campaign. On November 2, the Kickstarter goal had been reached, and the band later confirmed that they would release a new full-length album instead of an EP. The album, titled A Choice of Catastrophes, was released on September 8, 2017.

Touring
The band have toured frequently over the years and have shared the stage with acts such as: PIGFACE, Sleepytime Gorilla Museum, The Birthday Massacre, Daiquiri, Estradasphere, Screaming Mechanical Brain, Foxy Shazam, Clutch, Southcott, Mindless Self Indulgence, Dog Fashion Disco, Framing Hanley, Black Light Burns, Horse the Band, Plain White T's, Kill Hannah, Wesley Willis, and more.

Tub Ring are known for their energetic stage shows, purportedly intense enough to result in injury to the performers (for example, incorporating a tazer).

In January 2008, the band was invited to perform at the Sundance Film Festival as part of a Green Initiative sponsored event.

On a tour in 2008, Darren Keen played second guitar, for an impromptu set with Tub Ring in Houston, Texas. Later that year, while on tour with Mindless Self Indulgence, the band recruited Curtis Rx of the band Creature Feature to also play second guitar for a select portion of dates.

The 2010 tour for the album Secret Handshakes included Patrik Windsor on guitar, and Sean Motley on drums.

Side/related projects
Super 8-Bit Brothers
3-2-1 Activate!
Edison's Arm
Pum
The Pastries
Deli Meat and the French Eroticas
Sex & Violets

Rob Kleiner solo
In 2005, Rob Kleiner released his first solo album, No Eyes. On February 13, 2007, he released his second, and latest solo EP, Doctor Sleep. He is also a part of video game rock duo Super 8 Bit Brothers. In addition to his solo work, he's one of the main contributing members of Edison's Arm, and has scored several films, including Ending The Eternal, the feature documentary Working Class Rock Star, and Steve Balderson's films Watch Out as well as Stuck!.

Discography

Studio albums
Drake Equation (2001)
Fermi Paradox (2002)
Zoo Hypothesis (2004)
The Great Filter (2007)
Secret Handshakes (2010)
A Choice of Catastrophes (2017)

Demo albums
Stupid Pet Tricks (1992)
Music for the Bathroom (1993)
...And the Mashed Potato Mountain Etiquette (1995)
Super Sci-Fi Samurai Rockstar Ultra Turbo II (ver3.6) (1997)

Compilations
Book of Water (2001)
Optics and Sonics (2005)
The Best of Tub Ring: Polyvinyl Chloride (2017)

References

External links
 Myspace
 Purevolume
 The End Records Band Page
 Working Class Rock Star (documentary feat. Tub Ring)
 Tub Ring on Last.fm

Alternative rock groups from Chicago
American experimental rock groups
Punk rock groups from Illinois
Musical groups established in 1992
Musical groups disestablished in 2010
Musical groups reestablished in 2016
Underground, Inc. artists